An annular solar eclipse occurred at the Moon's ascending node of the orbit on January 15, 2010, with a magnitude of 0.91903. A solar eclipse occurs when the Moon passes between Earth and the Sun, thereby totally or partly obscuring the image of the Sun for a viewer on Earth. An annular solar eclipse occurs when the Moon's apparent diameter is smaller than the Sun's, blocking most of the Sun's light and causing the Sun to look like an annulus (ring). An annular eclipse appears as a partial eclipse over a region of the Earth thousands of kilometres wide.
It was the longest annular solar eclipse of the millennium, and the longest until December 23, 3043, with the length of maximum eclipse of 11 minutes, 7.8 seconds, and the longest duration of 11 minutes, 10.7 seconds. This is about 4 minutes longer than total solar eclipses could ever get. (The solar eclipse of January 4, 1992, was longer, at 11 minutes, 40.9 seconds, occurring in the middle of the Pacific Ocean.)

Lasting 11 minutes and 7.8 seconds, and eclipse magnitude of only 0.91903, this was the longest and smallest annular solar eclipse of the 21st century. It was an annular solar eclipse on January 15, 2010.

The eclipse was visible as only a partial eclipse in much of Africa, Eastern Europe, the Middle East and Asia. It was seen as an annular eclipse within a narrow stretch of  width across Central Africa, Maldives, South Kerala (India), South Tamil Nadu (India), Sri Lanka and parts of Bangladesh, Burma and China.

Summary of the Annular Solar Eclipse of January 15, 2010 

Eclipse Magnitude: 0.91903

Eclipse Obscuration: 0.84462

Gamma: 0.40016

Saros Series: 141st (23 of 70)

Sun Right Ascension: 19.8

Moon Right Ascension: 19.79

Sun Declination: -21.1

Moon Declination: -20.8

Sun Diameter: 1951.0 arcseconds

Moon Diameter: 1768.6 arcseconds

Radius of the Penumbral Shadow: 7,322.7 km (4,550.1 mi)

Radius of the Antumbral Shadow: 361.7 km (224.8 mi)

Path Width: 333.1 km (207 mi)

Greatest Eclipse: 2010 January 15 at 07:06:33.2 UTC

Apogee at 2010 January 17 at 01:41 UTC (406,433 km (252,546 mi))

Visibility of the eclipse

The eclipse started in the Central African Republic near the border with Chad, traversed DR Congo, Uganda, Kenya, passed through the northern tip of Tanzania, southwestern Somalia and three islands of Seychelles (Bird, Denis and Aride), before it entered the Indian Ocean, where it reached its greatest visibility. It then passed through Maldives. The annular eclipse at Malé, the capital city of the country, started at 12:20:17 and ended at 12:31:02 local time (UTC+5), lasting for 10 minutes and 45 seconds (645 seconds). This was also the longest duration of any eclipse with an international airport in its track.

At approximately 13:20 IST, the annular solar eclipse entered India at Thiruvananthapuram (Trivandrum), the capital of Kerala and exited India at Rameswaram, Tamil Nadu.

The eclipse was viewable for 10 minutes in India. After Rameswaram, it entered Sri Lanka at Delft Island, exited at Jaffna in Sri Lanka, crossed the Bay of Bengal and re-entered India in Mizoram. 

Thiruvananthapuram, which was the entry point of the eclipse in India, was equipped with telescopes and announced facilities for the public to view the eclipse. Vikram Sarabhai Space Centre, situated in Trivandrum, analysed the atmospheric-ionospheric parameters during the eclipse. Many scientists camped in the city to witness and study the eclipse.

At Rameswaram, the sunrise was not visible due to thick clouds, but it started getting clear at around 9am local time and became almost totally clear by the time the eclipse began. The sky had a thin layer of cirrus clouds till 2:30pm. Among the eclipse-watchers was Sky Watchers' Association of North Bengal (SWAN) from Siliguri at the foothills of West Bengal and Tamil Nadu Astronomical Association.

Dhanushkodi, which falls on the central line of the eclipse, was a good place to view the eclipse. The northernmost limit of shadow in India was Cuddalore, Neyveli, Erode, Kodaikanal, and Madurai. Other prime viewing locations in Tamil Nadu include Thoothukudi and Cape Comorin, 22 km north of the center line. The exact location of the line is between the NH end and the Dhanushkodi ruins. Dhanushkodi is about 2 km east of the central line.  The degree difference is about 0.2 between the central line – with Kodandaramar Temple and Dhanushkodi ruins vice versa. Dhanushkodi is about 5 km from the Kodandaramar Temple.

After South Asia, the antumbra passed through the southern tip of Bangladesh, Myanmar and China before leaving the Earth.

Gallery

Related eclipses

Eclipses of 2010 
 An annular solar eclipse on January 15.
 A partial lunar eclipse on June 26.
 A total solar eclipse on July 11.
 A total lunar eclipse on December 21.

Tzolkinex 
 Preceded: Solar eclipse of December 4, 2002

 Followed: Solar eclipse of February 26, 2017

Half-Saros cycle 
 Preceded: Lunar eclipse of January 9, 2001

 Followed: Lunar eclipse of January 21, 2019

Tritos 
 Preceded: Solar eclipse of February 16, 1999

 Followed: Solar eclipse of December 14, 2020

Solar Saros 141 
 Preceded: Solar eclipse of January 4, 1992

 Followed: Solar eclipse of January 26, 2028

Inex 
 Preceded: Solar eclipse of February 4, 1981

 Followed: Solar eclipse of December 26, 2038

Triad 
 Preceded: Solar eclipse of March 17, 1923

 Followed: Solar eclipse of November 15, 2096

Solar eclipses 2008–2011

Saros 141

Metonic series

Notes

References
NASA: Annular Solar Eclipse of 2010 January 15

NASA: Eclipses During 2010: Annular Solar Eclipse of January 15
NASA PDF graphic
Eclipse.org.uk: Annular eclipse of the Sun: 2010 January 15 
www.sciencemaldives.org: January 15th 2010 Solar Eclipse, Maldives 
Hermit.org Visibility graphics
www.eclipser.ca: Jay Anderson 2010 January 15 Annular Solar Eclipse

External links

 Annular Solar Eclipse of Dali, Yunnan, China
SpaceWeather.com: January 15, 2010 solar eclipse
 Eclipse over the Temple of Poseidon, APOD 1/18/2010, partial eclipse of Sounion, Greece
 Millennium Annular Solar Eclipse, APOD 1/22/2010, annularity of Kanyakumari, India, the same picture chosen as APOD again on 5/19/2012, Annular Solar Eclipse
 Eclipses in the Shade, APOD 1/23/2010, from Alif Alif Atoll, Maldives
 Annular Eclipse Over Myanmar, APOD 1/26/2010, annularity of Ananda Temple, Bagan, Myanmar
2010 Annular Eclipse January 15, 2010, from India by Jay Pasachoff
Solar Eclipse animation of January 15, 2010
ShadowAndSubstance.com: January 15, 2010, solar eclipse animations for geographical locations 
 Eclipse photography taken from Rameswaram, Tamil Nadu, India
Eclipse-Chasers: January 15, 2010 annular solar eclipse
 SWAN Website

2010 1 15
2010 in science
2010 01 15
January 2010 events